The High Life is the fifth studio album by the close harmony trio The Puppini Sisters, through Millionaire Records on 5 March 2016. The album is the trio's first album with new member Emma Smith, replacing Stephanie O'Brien who departed the group in 2012. It is also their first album since leaving their major label Universal Classics and Jazz and Verve.

Background and development
The High Life contains a mixture of original material (written by Puppini and Mullins) as well as their own takes on vintage standards such as "Accentuate The Positive" and "Tennessee Waltz" and the complete re-imagining of current pop and chart songs such as "Dear Future Husband" and "Chandelier".

This is the trio's first album with new redhead Emma Smith who joined the group towards the end of 2012 when Stephanie O'Brien and later Terrianne Passingham both departed.

To raise the necessary studio and marketing funds, the trio launched a crowding funding campaign through Pledge Music allowing fans to purchase the single album, the LP, the double deluxe album in addition to many other limited edition products and opportunities such as; the chance to duet with The Sisters on stage, to be able to appear on one of the album's tracks, copies of their previous arrangements and executive producer rights.

By 17 August, the album was fully funded and recording commenced the following month at The Premises Studios. With the album being released in March 2016 (Pledgers were able to receive the album on 25 February), the trio embarked on a UK tour to promote the album culminating in a London show at Islington Assembly Hall with special guest male dance crew, The Hoppers.

The Bonus Remix edition of the album was released on 21 October and contained both the original tracks as well as multiple remixes from an array of acclaimed DJ's such as The Real Tuesday Weld and Bart&Baker.

Track listing

Personnel
Personnel adapted from The High Life liner notes.

 Marcella Puppini – vocals, accordion
 Kate Mullins – vocals
 Emma Smith – vocals
 Blake Wilner – guitar
 Henrik Jensen – double bass
 Peter Ibbetson – drums, synthesizer
 William Bartlett – piano, keyboards
 Peter Ibbetson – drums, synthesizer
 John Shenoy – clarinet, alto saxophone, tenor saxophone
 Fred De Faye – producer, engineer
 Neil Tollitt – engineer
 Jonjo Keefe – engineer
 Boris Balkarov -executive producer

References

The Puppini Sisters albums
2016 albums